Emilie Anine Skovgaard Meng (31 July 1998 – ), a 17-year-old Danish girl, disappeared in Korsør in the early hours of 10 July 2016. Five months later, her body was found in Køge Municipality. The case received major media attention and police and civilian investigations.

Disappearance 
Meng was last seen leaving Korsør train station after a night out in Slagelse with her friends at 4 a.m. on 10 July 2016. She was expected to sing at a local church at 9:30 that morning, but never showed up. Many volunteers helped the police to look for Meng. Several tips led to three suspects, including a 33-year-old truck driver and a 67-year-old, who had his house searched five times, but they had nothing to do with the case. After four months the police had worked with three theories.

Discovery of body
Meng's body was found in a lake at Regnemarks Bakke near Borup on 24 December 2016. Two days later, a memorial ceremony was held at Korsør Station, where several hundred people were present.

The case remains unsolved.

Leads 
In 2021, Danish police took hold of a white van that at the time of the murder belonged to Peter Madsen, who was convicted for the 2017 killing of Swedish journalist Kim Wall, in order to look for possible traces of blood in the vehicle.

See also
List of solved missing persons cases
List of unsolved murders

References

2010s missing person cases
2016 murders in Denmark
Deaths by person in Europe
July 2016 events in Europe
Unsolved murders in Denmark
1998 births
2016 deaths
July 2016 crimes in Europe